The Bragg UNSW Press Prize for Science Writing was established in 2012 to recognise excellence in Australian science writing. The annual prize of A$7,000 is awarded to the best short non-fiction piece of science fiction with the aim of a general audience. Two runners up are awarded $1,500 each.

The prize is named in honour of Australia's first Nobel Laureates, father and son team William Henry Bragg and William Lawrence Bragg. The prize is supported by the Copyright Agency Cultural Fund and the UNSW Faculty of Science.

An associated anthology, The Best Australian Science Writing (NewSouth Publishing) collects the best of the year's science writing.

Winners 

 The 2012 winner of the first prize was Jo Chandler, for her piece "Storm front", an excerpt from her book Feeling the Heat (MUP 2011). The runners up were Peter McAllister, for his article "The evolution of the inadequate modern male" in Australasian Science and Ashley Hay, for her feature article "The Aussie Mozzie Posse" in the Good Weekend
 The 2013 winner of the first prize was Fred Watson, for his piece "Here come the ubernerds: Planets, Pluto and Prague" from his book Star-Craving Mad: Tales from a travelling astronomer (Allen & Unwin). The runners up were Gina Perry, for "Beyond the shock machine", an excerpt from Behind the Shock Machine: The untold story of the notorious Milgram psychology experiments (Scribe) and Professor Chris Turney for his piece "Martyrs to Gondwanaland: The cost of scientific exploration", an excerpt from his book 1912: The year the world discovered Antarctica (Text Publishing)
 The 2014 winner of the first prize was Jo Chandler, for her piece "TB and me: a medical souvenir" (The Global Mail). The runners up were Frank Bowden, for "Eleven grams of trouble" (Inside Story) and Peter Meredith, for "Weathering the storm" (Australian Geographic)
 The 2015 winner was Christine Kenneally, "The past may not make you feel better" (from The Invisible History of the Human Race, Black Inc.) with runners up Idan Ben-Barak, "Why aren't we dead yet" (from Why Aren't We Dead Yet, Scribe) and Trent Dalton, "Beating the odds" (The Weekend Australian)
 The 2016 winner was Ashley Hay, "The forest at the edge of time" (The Australian Book Review) with runners up Susan Double, "Beautiful contrivances" (Orchids Australia) and Fiona McMillan, "Lucy's lullaby: Song for the Ages"
 The 2017 winner was Alice Gordon, for "Trace Fossils: The silence of Ediacara, the shadow of uranium", first published in Griffith Review No. 55 - State of Hope. Runners up were Jo Chandler for "Grave Barrier Reef" and Elmo Keep for "The Pyramid at the end of the world".
The 2018 winner was Andrew Leigh, for "From bloodletting to placebo surgery", an excerpt from his book Randomistas: How Radical Researchers Changed Our World (Black Inc.). Runners up were Jo Chandler for "Amid fear and guns, polio finds a refuge" (Undark) and Margaret Wertheim for "Radical dimensions" (Aeon).
The 2019 winner was Melissa Fyfe, for "Getting cliterate", a profile of clitoris researcher Helen O'Connell (urologist), first published in the Good Weekend magazine. Runners up were Cameron Muir for "Ghost species and shadow places" (Griffith Review) and Jackson Ryan for "How CRISPR could save six billion chickens from the meat grinder" (CNET).
The 2020 winner was Ceridwen Dovey, for "True Grit", first published in Wired. Runners up were Ricky Finch for "The Case of the Missing Frogs" (The Australian) and Konrad Marshall for "Jeepers Creepers" (Good Weekend magazine).
The 2021 winner was Ceridwen Dovey, for "Everlasting free-fall", first published in the app, Alexander.
The 2022 winner was Lauren Fuge, for "Time travel and tipping points", first published in Cosmos Magazine.

References

External links
Bragg Prize home page
William Henry Bragg

Australian literary awards
2012 establishments in Australia
University of New South Wales
Australian science and technology awards